WPYO (95.3 FM), is a radio station licensed to Maitland, Florida. The station airs a Spanish contemporary hits format, and is branded as "El Zol 95.3.” Owned by Spanish Broadcasting System, it serves the Greater Orlando area. The station's transmitter is located in Pine Hills.

History
Prior to Cox Enterprises buying the station in 1999, the station was WTLN-FM, a contemporary Christian outlet. But after the sale that same year, on January 15, it flipped to Dance Top 40 as 95.3 Party, and became a success in the market with its mix of dance and hip-hop music. By 2004, the station had shifted to a hip-hop-driven direction, and rebranded as rhythmic contemporary Power 95.3, restoring the format to Orlando since the flip of WJHM (now WQMP) to urban contemporary in the 1990s (WJHM returned to Rhythmic in 2012, but changed to CHR in 2014).

On April 27, 2018, WPYO flipped to CHR, maintaining the Power branding and some of its airstaff. The change came in response to WQMP's recent flip to alternative rock, which briefly gave WXXL a monopoly in the format within the Orlando market.

In 2019, Cox Media Group transferred WPYO, along with Tampa Bay sister station WSUN, to CXR Radio, LLC, a divestiture trust run by Elliot B. Evers. The transfer followed the sale of the remainder of Cox Media Group from Cox Enterprises to Apollo Global Management; Cox had owned five FM stations in Orlando, one over the FCC limit of four, and the sale eliminated this grandfathered status.

On February 9, 2022, Spanish Broadcasting System (SBS) announced it would purchase WPYO and WSUN from CXR Radio for $12.5 million. The deal marks SBS’ entry into both markets. A version of the Power format without on-air personalities moved to one of WCFB's HD Radio subchannels, running as a commercial-free stream through the station's former app and website under the rebranded name "Power Orlando". The flip left WXXL as the only CHR station remaining in the Orlando-Winter Haven market until country station WOTW flipped to rhythmic contemporary as WFYY in August 2022.

On the station's final day as "Power", the station paid tribute to the run of "Power" and "Party" with an all-day live broadcast from 5:30 a.m. to midnight deemed "The Last Damn Show", where longtime listeners and former DJs dating back to the days of "Party" called in the station to give their personal station memories and give their own final farewell; in addition, the station would give a final run-through of their playlist, playing music through the day from each era of the station (from the dance music of "Party" to the hip-hop and pop music of "Power"). At midnight on April 1, 2022, after the entire airstaff gave one final goodbye before playing "Raise The Roof" by Uncle Luke (the first song that played on the station when it launched as "Party”; this was immediately followed by a final station identification and the playing of a final bumper for "Party" and one for "Power", which would fade out on an echo effect, followed by a moment of silence), the station flipped to a temporary simulcast of former sister station WDBO. On April 29, 2022, SBS officially closed on their purchase of WPYO; around 9:00 a.m. that day, the station began stunting with a loop of songs featured in their new Spanish contemporary hits format, which debuted May 9 at 6:00 a.m. local time as "El Zol 95.3," with “El Incomprendido” by Farruko being the first song played.

References

External links

PYO
Radio stations established in 1968
1968 establishments in Florida
Spanish-language radio stations in Florida
Contemporary hit radio stations in the United States